The 1995 NBA playoffs was the postseason tournament of the National Basketball Association's 1994–95 season. The tournament concluded with the Western Conference champion Houston Rockets defeating the Eastern Conference champion Orlando Magic 4 games to 0 in the NBA Finals. Hakeem Olajuwon was named NBA Finals MVP for the second straight time.

As of 2022, the 1995 Rockets are the lowest-seeded team to win the NBA Championship.

Houston became the eighth team to win back-to-back titles (after the Minneapolis Lakers of 1949 and 1950, and again 1952–54, and the Celtics dynasty of 1959–66 and again in 1968–69, as the LA Lakers of 1987 and 1988, Pistons of 1989 and 1990 and Bulls of 1991, 1992 and 1993). It would go on to happen five more times, with the Bulls winning 3 more from 1996 to 1998, the Lakers from 2000–2002 and 2009–2010, the Miami Heat from 2012–13, and the Golden State Warriors from 2017–18.  The Rockets championships were also part of a run that saw 4 teams win consecutive titles (The Lakers 1987–88, Pistons 1989–90, Bulls 1991–93 and 1996–98, Rockets 1994–95). That streak was stopped by a Spurs franchise, who like the Celtics of the 1980s, didn't win back-to-back titles, but did win numerous championships and is considered a dynasty.

The sixth-seeded Rockets (47–35) took out 4 impressive opponents on their way to the title, defeating the 3rd-seeded Utah Jazz (60–22), 2nd-seeded Phoenix Suns (59–23), top-seeded San Antonio Spurs (62–20) and Eastern Conference champion Orlando Magic (57–25) in the NBA Finals. In the first round against the Utah Jazz, the Houston Rockets came back from a 1-2 series deficit, winning Game 5 in Utah. In the second round against the Suns, the Rockets came back from a 2–0 and 3–1 series deficit without home-court advantage, winning Games 5 and 7 in Phoenix. Rockets center Hakeem Olajuwon dominated league MVP David Robinson and Shaquille O'Neal in consecutive series to win the title. The Rockets 47 wins were the fewest by an NBA champion since the Washington Bullets tallied 44 in 1978.

The 1995 Playoffs featured the first 3 playoff series victories in Magic history, as they beat the Boston Celtics, Chicago Bulls, and Indiana Pacers to win their first Eastern Conference title.

It also featured the return of Michael Jordan to the playoffs after a year and a half absence, returning in March, and the only time the Bulls didn't win a title with him on the roster since they started their string of titles in 1991.

Game 4 of the Celtics-Magic series was the last game played at Boston Garden. Boston returned to the playoffs in 2002, this time in the new FleetCenter (now TD Garden).

Game 3 of the Blazers-Suns series was the last game played at the then-Memorial Coliseum (renamed the Veterans Memorial Coliseum as of 2012). The Blazers continued their playoff streak at Rose Garden (now Moda Center) for the next 7 years.

Game 3 of the Spurs-Nuggets series was the final playoff game at McNichols Sports Arena; the Nuggets missed the playoffs in each of the arena's final four years. Denver returned to the playoffs in 2004, this time in the new Pepsi Center.

The Pacers made the Eastern Conference Finals for the second straight year (and finally defeated the New York Knicks on their way to doing so), but found the Magic too powerful to overcome. Coincidentally, they met all 3 playoff opponents (Orlando, Atlanta, and New York) they had in 1994, just in a different order.

Since the NBA playoffs expanded to 16 teams in 1984, the Jazz became the second team (along with the 1994 Sonics) to win at least 60 regular season games and lose in the first round, when they lost to the eventual NBA champion Rockets.

Bracket

First round

Eastern Conference first round

(1) Orlando Magic vs. (8) Boston Celtics

 Game 4 was the last game at Boston Garden.

This was the first playoff meeting between the Celtics and the Magic.

(2) Indiana Pacers vs. (7) Atlanta Hawks

This was the third playoff meeting between these two teams, with each team winning one series apiece.

(3) New York Knicks vs. (6) Cleveland Cavaliers

This was the second playoff meeting between these two teams, with the Knicks winning the first meeting.

(4) Charlotte Hornets vs. (5) Chicago Bulls

This was the first playoff meeting between the Hornets and the Bulls.

Western Conference first round

(1) San Antonio Spurs vs. (8) Denver Nuggets

 Game 3 was the final playoff game at McNichols Sports Arena.

This was the fourth playoff meeting between these two teams, with the Spurs winning two of the first three meetings.

(2) Phoenix Suns vs. (7) Portland Trail Blazers

 Game 3 was the Blazers' final game at Memorial Coliseum.

This was the fifth playoff meeting between these two teams, with each team winning two series apiece.

(3) Utah Jazz vs. (6) Houston Rockets

 John Stockton hits the game-winning lay-up with 2.4 seconds left.

This was the third playoff meeting between these two teams, with each team winning one series apiece.

(4) Seattle SuperSonics vs. (5) Los Angeles Lakers

This was the sixth playoff meeting between these two teams, with the Lakers winning three of the first five meetings.

Conference semifinals

Eastern Conference semifinals

(1) Orlando Magic vs. (5) Chicago Bulls

 Nick Anderson's clutch steal off Michael Jordan, leading to his comments on Jordan's jersey number 45, saying he thought Jordan was playing like a 45-year-old. Meanwhile, Horace Grant goes up for the game-winning dunk with 6.2 seconds remaining.

 Jordan returns to his more familiar jersey number 23.

This was the first playoff meeting between the Bulls and the Magic.

(2) Indiana Pacers vs. (3) New York Knicks

 Reggie Miller scores 8 points in 8.9 seconds, including 2 straight 3's in 5.5 seconds, to rally from a 105–99 deficit.

 Rik Smits hits the game-tying jumper with 34 seconds left to force OT.

 Patrick Ewing hits the game-winner with 1.8 seconds left.

 Ewing misses the game tying lay-up at the buzzer; The Pacers became the 4th NBA road team to win Game 7 after leading series 3–1.

This was the third playoff meeting between these two teams, with the Knicks winning the first two meetings.

Western Conference semifinals

(1) San Antonio Spurs vs. (5) Los Angeles Lakers

 Nick Van Exel hits the game-tying 3 with 10.2 seconds left in regulation, then the game-winning 3 with 5 tenths left in OT.

This was the fifth playoff meeting between these two teams, with the Lakers winning the first four meetings.

(2) Phoenix Suns vs. (6) Houston Rockets

 Mario Elie's game-winning "Kiss of Death" three-pointer with 7.1 seconds left, the Rockets became the 5th team in NBA history to overcome a 3–1 series deficit. The Rockets would also overcome a 3–1 deficit 20 years later against the Los Angeles Clippers.

This was the second playoff meeting between these two teams, with the Rockets winning the first meeting.

Conference finals

Eastern Conference finals

(1) Orlando Magic vs. (2) Indiana Pacers

Four straight go-ahead shots to end the game: 1st, Brian Shaw's 3 with 13.3 seconds left; 2nd, Reggie Miller's 3 with 5.2 seconds left; 3rd, Penny Hardaway's 3 with 1.3 seconds left; finally, Rik Smits' buzzer-beating 2.

This was the second playoff meeting between these two teams, with the Pacers winning the first meeting.

Western Conference finals

(1) San Antonio Spurs vs. (6) Houston Rockets

 Robert Horry hits the game-winner with 6.5 seconds left.

This was the third playoff meeting between these two teams, with the Rockets winning the first two meetings.

NBA Finals: (E1) Orlando Magic vs. (W6) Houston Rockets

Nick Anderson misses 4 straight free throws to set up Kenny Smith's game-tying 3 with 1.6 seconds left; Robert Horry blocks Dennis Scott's game-winning 3-point attempt at the buzzer in regulation; Hakeem Olajuwon tips in Clyde Drexler's missed layup with 3 tenths left in OT.

 Orlando becomes the 2nd team in NBA Finals history to lose the first two games at home while having home-court advantage.

 Robert Horry's clutch 3 with 14.1 seconds left to put Houston up 104–100.

 Hakeem Olajuwon brings the Finals to a close by hitting a three-pointer over Shaquille O'Neal with 11.5 seconds left.

This was the first playoff meeting between the Rockets and the Magic.

Notes
Both #5 seeds beat their #4 seeded opponent in the first round for the third straight year.
The Rockets are the lowest seeded team to win a title (#6).
In the Eastern Conference Semifinals, the Pacers had earned the #2 seed via the Central Division title, but the Knicks had homecourt advantage because of a better regular season record.
 Jordan changed his number back to 23 after the game 1 loss to the Orlando Magic, which led to him being fined.

References

External links
Basketball-Reference.com's 1995 NBA Playoffs page

National Basketball Association playoffs
Playoffs
Sports in Portland, Oregon
GMA Network television specials

fi:NBA-kausi 1994–1995#Pudotuspelit